Kalyani is a 1952 Indian Tamil-language psychological drama film directed by Acharya (T. G. Raghavachari) and M. Masthan, and produced by T. R. Sundaram of Modern Theatres. The film portrays the life of a mentally-deranged man and is heavily inspired by 1948 American film The Snake Pit. It was later remade in Telugu as Atthainti Kaapuram in 1952. Kalyani stars M. N. Nambiar.  B. S. Saroja, D. Balasubramaniam, M. G. Chakrapani and T. P. Muthulakshmi had supporting roles.

Plot 

Moorthi struggles with mental problems. He marries Kalyani, a young woman. The plot revolves around their relationship and the many problems faced by Kalyani, who eventually succeeds in curing her husband's mental illness.

Cast 

Male cast
 M. N. Nambiar as Moorthi
 D. Balasubramaniam as Subbaiah Pillai
 M. G. Chakrapani as Doctor
 K. V. Srinivasan as himself
 A. Karunanidhi as Accountant Pillai
 G. Muthukrishnan as Sekhar
 M. E. Madhavan as Broker Rengasami
 V. M. Ezhumalai as Kuppusami
 S. M. Thirupathisami as Inspector
 K. K. Soundar as Psychology Doctor

Female cast
 B. S. Saroja as Kalyani
 P. S. Sivabhagyam as Nagamma
 M. Saroja as Saroja
 M. S. Subhadra as Neela
 T. P. Muthulakshmi as Kamala
 P. S. Gnanam as Kamala's mother
 G. Sakunthala as Komalam
 K. T. Dhanalakshmi as Akilantam
Dance
 Kerala Sisters
 A. Chitra

Production 
Kalyani was originally directed by Acharya (T. G. Raghavachari). Midway through production, he contracted tuberculosis, so cinematographer M. Masthan (Mohammed Masthan) took over directing and completed it to the satisfaction of producer T. R. Sundaram and Acharya. Choreography was handled by A. K. Chopra, K. R. Kumar, K. K. Sinha, and Dhandapani.

Soundtrack 
The music was composed by S. Dakshinamoorthi and G. Ramanathan with lyrics written by Kannadasan.

Reception 
The film did not fare well at the box office.

References

External links 
 

1950s psychological drama films
1950s Tamil-language films
1952 films
Films about psychiatry
Films about schizophrenia
Films based on American novels
Films scored by G. Ramanathan
Films scored by Susarla Dakshinamurthi
Films set in psychiatric hospitals
Indian black-and-white films
Indian psychological drama films
Tamil films remade in other languages